Lower Wood, Ashwellthorpe is a  biological Site of Special Scientific Interest south-east of Wymondham in Norfolk. It is managed by the Norfolk Wildlife Trust.

This ancient wood on chalky boulder clay has a diverse ground flora with uncommon species such as wood spurge,  early-purple orchid, common twayblade, ramsons, water avens and woodruff.

The wood is open to the public.

References

Norfolk Wildlife Trust
Sites of Special Scientific Interest in Norfolk